Anarchism is generally defined as the political philosophy which holds the state to be undesirable, unnecessary and harmful as well as opposing authority and hierarchical organization in the conduct of human relations. Proponents of anarchism, known as anarchists, advocate stateless societies based on non-hierarchical voluntary associations. While anarchism holds the state to be undesirable, unnecessary and harmful, opposition to the state is not its central or sole definition. Anarchism can entail opposing authority or hierarchy in the conduct of all human relations.

Anarchism is often considered a far-left ideology and much of its economics and legal philosophy reflect anti-authoritarian interpretations of communism, collectivism, syndicalism, mutualism, or participatory economics. As anarchism does not offer a fixed body of doctrine from a single particular worldview, many anarchist types and traditions exist, not all of which are mutually exclusive. Anarchist schools of thought can differ fundamentally, supporting anything from extreme individualism to complete collectivism. Strains of anarchism have often been divided into the categories of social and individualist anarchism or similar dual classifications. Other classifications may add mutualism as a third category while some consider it part of individualist anarchism and others regard it to be part of social anarchism.

There are many philosophical differences among anarchists concerning questions of ideology, values and strategy. Ideas about how anarchist societies should work vary considerably, especially with respect to economics. There are also disagreements about how such a society might be brought about, with some anarchists being committed to a strategy of nonviolence while others advocate armed struggle.

Definitional concerns 

Anarchist schools of thought encompass not only a range of individual schools, but also a considerable divergence in the use of some key terms. Some terms such as socialism have been subject to multiple definitions and ideological struggle throughout the period of the development of anarchism. Others such as capitalism are used in divergent and often contradictory ways by different schools within the tradition. In addition, the meanings of terms such as mutualism have changed over time, sometimes without spawning new schools. All of these terminological difficulties contribute to misunderstandings within and about anarchism. A central concern is whether the term anarchism is defined in opposition to hierarchy, authority and the state, or state and capitalism. Debates over the meaning of the term emerge from the fact that it refers to both an abstract philosophical position and to intellectual, political and institutional traditions, all of which have been fraught with conflict. Some minimal, abstract definitions encourage the inclusion of figures, movements and philosophical positions which have historically positioned themselves outside, or even in opposition to, individuals and traditions that have identified themselves as anarchist. While opposition to the state is central, there is a lot of talk among scholars and anarchists on the matter and various currents perceive anarchism slightly differently.

While it might be true to say that anarchism is a cluster of political philosophies opposing authority and hierarchical organization (including the state, capitalism, nationalism and all associated institutions) in the conduct of all human relations in favour of a society based on voluntary association, freedom and decentralisation, this definition has its own shortcomings as the definition based on etymology (which is simply a negation of a ruler), or based on anti-statism (anarchism is much more than that) or even the anti-authoritarian (which is an a posteriori concussion).

Nonetheless, major elements of the definition of anarchism include the following:
 The will for a non-coercive society.
 The rejection of the state apparatus.
 The belief that human nature allows humans to exist in or progress toward such a non-coercive society.
 A suggestion on how to act to pursue the ideal of anarchy.

Usages in political circles have varied considerably. In 1894, Richard T. Ely noted that the term had "already acquired a variety of meanings". In its most general sense, these included the view that society is "a living, growing organism, the laws of which are something different from the laws of individual action". Several years earlier in 1888, the individualist anarchist Benjamin Tucker included the full text of a "Socialistic Letter" by Ernest Lesigne in his essay on "State Socialism and Anarchism". According to Lesigne, there are two socialisms: "One is dictatorial, the other libertarian". As an anti-capitalist and libertarian socialist philosophy, anarchism is placed on the far-left of the political spectrum and much of its economics and legal philosophy reflect anti-authoritarian interpretations of left-wing politics such as communism, collectivism, syndicalism, mutualism, or participatory economics. As anarchism does not offer a fixed body of doctrine from a single particular worldview, many anarchist types and traditions exist and varieties of anarchy diverge widely. As a result, anarchist schools of thought can differ fundamentally yet maintain the common tenets of anarchism, supporting anything from extreme individualism to complete collectivism. Strains of anarchism have often been divided into the categories of social and individualist anarchism, or similar dual classifications. Nonetheless, anti-capitalism is considered a necessary element of anarchism by most anarchists.

Individualist anarchism vs. social anarchism 
Due to the many anarchist schools of thought, anarchism can be divided into two or more categories, the most used being individualist anarchism vs. social anarchism. Other categorizations may include green anarchism and/or left and right anarchism. Terms like anarcho-socialism or socialist anarchism can also be used as synonymous for social anarchism, but this is rejected by most anarchists since they generally consider themselves socialists of the libertarian tradition and are seen as unnecessary and confusing when not used as synonymous for libertarian or stateless socialism vis-à-vis authoritarian or state socialism. Anarchism has been historically identified with the socialist and anti-capitalist movement, with the main divide being between anti-market anarchists who support some form of decentralised economic planning and pro-market anarchists who support free-market socialism, therefore such terms are mainly used by anarcho-capitalism theorists and scholars who recognize anarcho-capitalism to differentiate between the two. For similar reasons, anarchists also reject categorizations such as left and right anarchism (anarcho-capitalism and national-anarchism), seeing anarchism as a libertarian socialist and radical left-wing or far-left ideology.

While most anarcho-capitalists theorists and scholars divide anarchism into social anarchism vis-à-vis individualist anarchism meaning socialism vs. capitalism, seeing the two as mutually exclusive although accepting all anarchist schools of thought under panarchy on the basis of voluntaryism, anarchist theorists and scholars opposing to anarcho-capitalism reject this, not seeing them as a struggle between socialism and capitalism or as mutually exclusive, but instead as complementary, with their differences mainly being based on the means to attain anarchy, rather than on their ends, arguing against certain anarcho-capitalist theorists and scholars who see individualist anarchism as pro-capitalist and reiterating that anarchism as a whole is socialist, meaning libertarian and anti-statist socialism. Many anarcho-communists regard themselves as radically individualists, seeing anarcho-communism as the best social system for the realization of individual freedom. Notwithstanding the name, collectivist anarchism is also seen as a blend of individualism and collectivism. Anarchism is generally considered an individualist philosophy, opposing all forms of authoritarian collectivism, but one which does see the individual or the community as complementary rather than mutually exclusive, with anarcho-communism and social anarchism in particular most rejecting the individualist–collectivist dichotomy. Finally, social anarchism is a term used in the United States to refer to Murray Bookchin's circle and its omonymous journal.

Schools of thought such as anarcha-feminism, anarcho-pacifism, anarcho-primitivism, anarcho-transhumanism and green anarchism have different economic views and can be either part of individualist anarchism or social anarchism. To differentiate it from individualist anarchism, anarchists prefer using social anarchism, a term used to characterize certain strides of anarchism vis-à-vis individualist anarchism, with the former focusing on the social aspect and generally being more organisational as well as supporting decentralised economic planning and the latter focusing on the individual and generally being more anti-organisational as well as supporting a free-market form of socialism, respectively, rather than seeing the two categories as mutually exclusive or as socialism vis-à-vis capitalism, leading to anarchism without adjectives. Mutualism is seen as the middle or third category between social anarchism and individualist anarchism, although it has been considered part of both social anarchism and individualist anarchism. Pierre-Joseph Proudhon spoke of social individualism and described mutualism and the freedom it pursued as the synthesis between communism and property.

From a materialist perspective, individualist anarchism is the anarchist form in the pre-capitalist and largely agrarian and merchantilist capitalism before the Industrial Revolution, during which individualist anarchism became a form of artisanal and self-employed socialism, especially in the United States. Instead, social anarchism is anarchism in an industrial society, being the form of industrial or proletarian socialism, with post-left anarchy and its criticism of industrial technology and anti-workerism arising in a post-industrial society. Some anarchists may see such categorisations in these terms. Despite their differences, these are all forms of libertarian socialism. Before socialism became associated in the 20th century with Marxist–Leninist states and similar forms of authoritarian and statist socialism, considered by critics as state capitalism and administrative command economies rather than planned economies, the word socialism was a broad concept which was aimed at solving the labour problem through radical changes in the capitalist economy. This caused issues between traditional anarchists and anarcho-captalists, whose understanding of socialism is that of the 20th century Marxist–Leninist states and whose school of thought is generally not recognized as part of anarchism.

Anarchists such as Luigi Galleani and Errico Malatesta have seen no contradiction between individualist anarchism and social anarchism, with the latter especially seeing the issues not between the two forms of anarchism, but between anarchists and non-anarchists. Anarchists such as Benjamin Tucker argued that it was "not Socialist Anarchism against Individualist Anarchism, but of Communist Socialism against Individualist Socialism". Similarly, the view of an individualist–socialist divide is contested as individualist anarchism is largely socialistic.

Ends and means 

Among anarchists, there is no consensus on the legitimacy or utility of violence in revolutionary struggle. For example, Mikhail Bakunin, Peter Kropotkin, Emma Goldman and Errico Malatesta wrote of violence as a necessary and sometimes desirable force in revolutionary settings. At the same time, they denounced acts of individual terrorism, see Bakunin's "The Program of the International Brotherhood" (1869) and Malatesta's "Violence as a Social Factor" (1895). Other anarchists such as Leo Tolstoy and Dorothy Day have been advocates of pacifism.

Anarchists have often been portrayed as dangerous and violent, possibly due to a number of high-profile violent actions, including riots, assassinations, insurrections and terrorism committed by some anarchists as well as persistently negative media portrayals. Late 19th-century revolutionaries encouraged acts of political violence, called propaganda of the deed, such as bombings and the assassinations of heads of state to further anarchism. However, the term originally referred to exemplary forms of direct action meant to inspire the masses to revolution and propaganda of the deed may be violent or nonviolent.

While all anarchists consider antimilitarism (opposition to war) to be inherent to their philosophy, anarcho-pacifists take this further by following Tolstoy's belief in pacifism. Although numerous anarchist-related initiatives have been based on the tactic of nonviolence (see Earth First! and Food Not Bombs), many anarchists reject pacifism as an ideology, instead supporting a diversity of tactics. Authors Ward Churchill (Pacifism as Pathology, 1986) and Peter Gelderloos (How Nonviolence Protects the State, 2005;  "The Failure of Nonviolence", 2013) have published influential books critical of pacifist doctrine which they view as ineffectual and hypocritical. In a 2010 article, author Randall Amster argued for the development of a "complementarity of tactics" to bridge the pacifist and more militant aspects of anarchism.

As a result of anarchism's critical view of certain types of private property, many anarchists see the destruction of property as an acceptable form of violence or argue that it is not in fact violence at all. In her widely cited 1912 essay Direct Action, Voltairine de Cleyre drew on American historical events, including the destroying of revenue stamps and the Boston Tea Party as a defense of such activities.

Many anarchists participate in subversive organizations as a means to undermine the establishment, such as Food Not Bombs, radical labor unions, alternative media and radical social centers. This is in accordance with the anarchist ideal that governments are intrinsically evil and that only by destroying the power of governments can individual freedoms and liberties be preserved. However, some anarchist schools in theory adopt the concept of dual power which means creating the structures for a new anti-authoritarian society in the shell of the old, hierarchical one.

Participation in statist democracy 

While most anarchists firmly oppose voting, or otherwise participating in the state institution, there are a few that disagree. The prominent anarchist Pierre-Joseph Proudhon stood for election to the French Constituent Assembly twice in 1848. In the 1890s, Paul Brousse developed the concept of libertarian municipalism in Switzerland which involved participating in local elections. Anarchists have opposed voting for multiple reasons. Taking part in elections has historically resulted in radicals becoming part of the system they oppose rather than ending it. Voting acknowledges the state's legitimacy.

During the 2004 United States presidential election, the anarchist collective CrimethInc. launched "Don't Just Vote, Get Active", a campaign promoting the importance of direct action rather than electoral change. Anarchists in other countries often engage in similar anti-voting campaigns and advocate a more pragmatic approach, including voting in referendums. Other prominent anarchists like Howard Zinn and Noam Chomsky have pledged their support for progressive candidates such as Ralph Nader. In addition to merely voting, some anarchists such as Proudhon and more recently Icelandic activist Smári McCarthy have stood for and won elections to national legislative bodies. American individualist anarchist Lysander Spooner argued that voting was a legitimate means of self-defense against the state and noted that many supporters of the state consider both voting and abstention to be acknowledgments of the state's legitimacy. Spooner's essay "No Treason" offers an individualist anarchist rebuttal to the argument that existing democratic governments are justified by majority consent.

During the 2014 Scottish independence referendum, there was debate within anarchist circles about whether to take an abstentionist position, vote for independence, or to vote to remain in the United Kingdom, thus anarchists rarely fitted into the easy binary of Yes/No voters of the referendum, with all seeking to go beyond the choices offered at the ballot box. There was also a debate about what Scottish independence would mean for the anarchist movement and social struggle. Groups like the Anarchist Federation in Scotland (mainly in Edinburgh and Glasgow) took a critical stance skeptical of the benefits of Scottish independence.

Within the United Kingdom, there was considerable debate around the Brexit vote in 2016. Anarchists are traditionally opposed to the European Union, yet the vote was seen as one imposed by two factions of the right-wing. Yet again, there was debate about whether to vote to Remain in the European Union, abstain (some left communists argued for abstaining) or vote to Leave since the United Kingdom government (the Conservative Party) was mostly in favour of remain while UK Independence Party and far-right parties favoured Leave. There was also debate within the left amongst anarchists and those who considered themselves to have a Lexit (Left Exit position). The victory of the Leave side united anarchists, whether voters or abstainers, against the racist incidents and rise of right-wing populism and neo-nationalism which was considered to have happened following the result of the vote. Many anarchists and anti-authoritarian leftists argue that Brexit was negative for social struggles and migrants in particular and considerable efforts were made to analyze why the Leave result happened.

Democracy in anarchism 
For individualist anarchists, "the system of democracy, of majority decision, is held null and void. Any impingement upon the natural rights of the person is unjust and a symbol of majority tyranny". Libertarian municipalist Murray Bookchin criticized individualist anarchists for opposing democracy and said majority rule is consistent with anarchism. While preferring the term assembly rather than democracy, Bookchin has in turn been accused of municipal statism, i.e. non-anarchism. Later, Bookchin renounced anarchism to identify himself as an advocate of Communalism.

Violence and non-violence 

Anarchists have often been portrayed as dangerous and violent due mainly to a number of high-profile violent acts including riots, assassinations and insurrections involving anarchists. However, the use of terrorism and assassination is condemned by most anarchist ideology, although there remains no consensus on the legitimacy or utility of violence. Some anarchists have opposed coercion while others have supported it, particularly in the form of violent revolution on the path to anarchy.

Some anarchists share Leo Tolstoy's Christian anarchist belief in nonviolence. These anarcho-pacifists advocate nonviolent resistance as the only method of achieving a truly anarchist revolution. They often see violence as the basis of government and coercion and argue that as such violence is illegitimate, no matter who is the target. Some of Pierre-Joseph Proudhon's French followers even saw strike action as coercive and refused to take part in such traditional socialist tactics.

Other anarchists advocate Marshall Rosenberg's Nonviolent Communication that relates to peoples fundamental needs and feelings using strategies of requests, observations and empathy yet providing for the use of protective force while rejecting pacifism as a compromising strategy of the left that just perpetuates violence.

Other anarchists such as Mikhail Bakunin and Errico Malatesta saw violence as a necessary and sometimes desirable force. Malatesta took the view that it is "necessary to destroy with violence, since one cannot do otherwise, the violence which denies [the means of life and for development] to the workers" (Umanità Nova, number 125, 6 September 1921).

Between 1894 and 1901, individual anarchists assassinated numerous heads of state, including:
 French President Sadi Carnot (1894)
 Empress consort Elisabeth of Austria (1898)
 King Umberto I of Italy (1900)
 United States President William McKinley (1901)

Such propaganda of the deed was not popular among anarchists and many in the movement condemned the tactic. President William McKinley's assassin Leon Czolgosz claimed to be a disciple of Emma Goldman. Goldman disavowed the act, although she did not condemn Czolgosz's motivations in doing it. Goldman included in her definition of anarchism the observation that all governments rest on violence and this is one of the many reasons they should be opposed. Goldman herself did not oppose tactics like assassination until she went to Russia, where she witnessed the violence of the Russian state and the Red Army. From then on, Goldman condemned the use of terrorism, especially by the state, but she still supported most other forms of revolutionary violence throughout her life. In a debate with a pacifist five years before her death, she countered that "the organized force used against the followers of Gandhi has finally forced them to use violence, much to the distress of Gandhi" and concluded that "as a method of combating the complex social injustices and inequalities, non-resistance cannot be a decisive factor" (non-resistance was the term for nonviolence used by Tolstoy and other early 20th century pacifists). Goldman at this time was an information officer for the anarchist militias of the Spanish Revolution which were committed to armed struggle.

Depictions in the press and popular fiction (for example, a malevolent bomb-throwing anarchist in Joseph Conrad's The Secret Agent) helped create a lasting public impression that anarchists are violent terrorists. This perception was enhanced by events such as the Haymarket riot, where anarchists were blamed for throwing a bomb at police who came to break up a public meeting in Chicago. More recently, anarchists have been involved in protests against World Trade Organization (WTO) and International Monetary Fund (IMF) meetings across the globe which the media has described as violent or riots. Traditionally, May Day in London has also been a day of marching, but in recent years the Metropolitan Police have warned that a "hardcore of anarchists" are intent on causing violence. Anarchists often respond that it is the police who initiate violence at these demonstrations, with anarchists who are otherwise peaceful sometimes forced to defend themselves. The anarchists involved in such protests often formed black blocs at these protests and some engaged in property destruction, vandalism, or in violent conflicts with police, although others stuck to non-violent principles. Those participating in black blocs distinguish between violence and property destruction as they claim that violence is when a person inflicts harm to another person while property destruction or property damage is not violence, although it can have indirect harm such as financial harm. Most anarchists do not consider the destruction of property to be violent as do most activists who believe in non-violence.

Pacifism 

Most anarchists consider opposition to militarism to be inherent in their philosophy. Some anarchists take it further and follow Leo Tolstoy's belief in non-violence (note that these anarcho-pacifists are not necessarily Christian anarchists as Tolstoy was), advocating nonviolent resistance as the only method of achieving a truly anarchist revolution.

Anarchist literature often portrays war as an activity in which the state seeks to gain and consolidate power, both domestically and in foreign lands. Many anarchists subscribe to Randolph Bourne's view that "war is the health of the state". Anarchists believe that if they were to support a war, they would be strengthening the state—indeed, Peter Kropotkin was alienated from other anarchists when he expressed support for the British in World War I.

Individualism vs. collectivism 

While some anarchists favour collective property or no property, others such as some American individualist anarchists like Benjamin Tucker and Lysander Spooner support a form of private property while opposing property titles to unused land. Tucker argues that collectivism in property is absurd: "That there is an entity known as the community which is the rightful owner of all land, [...] I maintain that the community is a non-entity, that it has no existence". He was particularly adamant in his opposition to communism, even to the point of asserting that those who opposed private property were not anarchists: "Anarchism is a word without meaning, unless it includes the liberty of the individual to control his product or whatever his product has brought him through exchange in a free market—that is, private property. Whoever denies private property is of necessity an Archist". Similarly, Albert Meltzer argued that since individualist anarchists like Tucker promote the idea of private armies, they actually support a "limited State", contending that it "is only possible to conceive of Anarchism which is free, communistic and offering no economic necessity for repression of countering it". Anarcho-communists reject the criticism, pointing to the principle of voluntary association that underpins their theory and differentiates it from state communism. Some individualist anarchists are willing to recognize such communism as a legitimate form. Kevin Carson writes that "free market, libertarian communist, syndicalism, and other kinds of collectivist anarchists must learn to coexist in peace and mutual respect today, in our fight against the corporate state, and tomorrow, in the panarchy that is likely to succeed it".

Some forms of anarcho-communism such as insurrectionary anarchism are strongly influenced by egoism and radical individualism, believing anarcho-communism is the best social system for the realisation of individual freedom. Hence, most anarcho-communists view anarcho-communism itself as a way of reconciling the opposition between the individual and society. Furthermore, post-left anarchists like Bob Black went as far as to argue that "communism is the final fulfillment of individualism. [...] The apparent contradiction between individualism and communism rests on a misunderstanding of both. [...] Subjectivity is also objective: the individual really is subjective. It is nonsense to speak of "emphatically prioritizing the social over the individual," [...]. You may as well speak of prioritizing the chicken over the egg. Anarchy is a "method of individualization." It aims to combine the greatest individual development with the greatest communal unity". Max Baginski has argued that property and the free market are just other "spooks", what Stirner called to refer mere illusions, or ghosts in the mind, writing: "Modern Communists are more individualistic than Stirner. To them, not merely religion, morality, family and State are spooks, but property also is no more than a spook, in whose name the individual is enslaved — and how enslaved! [...] Communism thus creates a basis for the liberty and Eigenheit of the individual. I am a Communist because I am an Individualist. Fully as heartily the Communists concur with Stirner when he puts the word take in place of demand — that leads to the dissolution of property, to expropriation. Individualism and Communism go hand in hand". Peter Kropotkin argued that "Communism is the one which guarantees the greatest amount of individual liberty — provided that the idea that begets the community be Liberty, Anarchy [...]. Communism guarantees economic freedom better than any other form of association, because it can guarantee wellbeing, even luxury, in return for a few hours of work instead of a day's work". Dielo Truda similarly argued that "[t]his other society will be libertarian communism, in which social solidarity and free individuality find their full expression, and in which these two ideas develop in perfect harmony". In "My Perspectives" of Willful Disobedience (2: 12), it was argued as such: "I see the dichotomies made between individualism and communism, individual revolt and class struggle, the struggle against human exploitation and the exploitation of nature as false dichotomies and feel that those who accept them are impoverishing their own critique and struggle".

The Right to Be Greedy is a book published in 1974 by an American Situationist collective called For Ourselves: Council for Generalized Self-Management which Black describes it in its preface as an "audacious attempt to synthesize a collectivist social vision of left-wing origin with an individualistic (for lack of a better word) ethic usually articulated on the right". Its authors say that "[t]he positive conception of egoism, the perspective of communist egoism, is the very heart and unity of our theoretical and practical coherence". The book was highly influenced by the work of Max Stirner, with Black humorously suggesting that it was a synthesis of Marxism and Stirner's philosophy which may be called Marxism–Stirnerism just as he wrote an essay on Groucho-Marxism, writing in the preface to The Right to be Greedy: "If Marxism-Stirnerism is conceivable, every orthodoxy prating of freedom or liberation is called into question, anarchism included. The only reason to read this book, as its authors would be the first to agree, is for what you can get out of it".

Although commonly misconcepted, Marxism rejected egalitarianism in the sense of greater equality between classes, clearly distinguishing it from the socialist notion of the abolition of classes based on the division between workers and owners of productive property. Marx and Engels believed that an international proletarian revolution would bring about a socialist society which would then eventually give way to a communist stage of social development which would be a classless, stateless, moneyless, humane society erected on common ownership. However, Marx's view of classlessness was not the subordination of society to a universal interest (such as a universal notion of equality), but it was about the creation of the conditions that would enable individuals to pursue their true interests and desires, making his notion of communist society radically individualistic. Marx was a proponent of two principles, the first ("To each according to his contribution") applied to socialism and the second ("From each according to their ability, to each according to their needs") to an advanced communist society. Although his position is often confused or conflated with distributive egalitarianism in which only the goods and services resulting from production are distributed according to a notional equality, Marx eschewed the entire concept of equality as abstract and bourgeois in nature, preferring to focus on more concrete principles such as opposition to exploitation on materialist grounds and economic logic. He is a believer in human freedom and human development. For Marx, the "true realm of freedom" consists in the "development of human powers as an end in itself". He conceives of a communist society as one in which "the full and free development of every individual forms the ruling principle". Marx justified the forms of equality he did advocate such as the communal ownership and control of the economy on the grounds that they led to human freedom and human development rather than simply because they were egalitarian, writing that in such a society there are "[u]niversally developed individuals, whose social relations, as their own communal relations, are hence also subordinated to their own communal control". This communal control includes "their subordination of their communal, social productivity as their social wealth".

Identity politics

Gender 

Anarcha-feminism is a kind of radical feminism that espouses the belief that patriarchy is a fundamental problem in society, but it was not explicitly formulated as such until the early 1970s during the second-wave feminist movement.

Early first-wave feminist Mary Wollstonecraft held proto-anarchist views and William Godwin is often considered a feminist anarchist precursor. Early French feminists such as Jenny d'Héricourt and Juliette Adam also criticised the misogyny in the anarchism of Pierre-Joseph Proudhon during the 1850s. While most anarchists of the period did not take these ideas seriously, others such as Florence Finch Kelly and Moses Harman held gender equality as a topic of significant importance. Anarcha-feminism garnered further attention through the work of early 20th-century authors and theorists including Emma Goldman and Voltairine de Cleyre.

In the Spanish Civil War, an anarcha-feminist group called Mujeres Libres organized to defend both anarchist and feminist ideas.

Ethnicity 

Black anarchism opposes the existence of a state, capitalism and subjugation and domination of people of color and favors a non-hierarchical organization of society.

Theorists include Ashanti Alston, Lorenzo Komboa Ervin and Sam Mbah. Some of these theorists have had past experiences with the Black Panther Party and came to anarchism after they became critical of the Black Panther Party's brand of Marxist–Leninism. Anarchist People of Color (APOC) was created as a forum for non-white anarchists to express their thoughts about racial issues within the anarchist movement, particularly within the United States. Anti-Racist Action is not an anarchist group, but many anarchists are involved. It focuses on publicly confronting antisemites, racists, supremacists and others such as the Ku Klux Klan, neo-Nazi groups and the like.

Most modern and historical anarchists describe themselves as anti-racists. Many early anarchists, notably Lucy Parsons (a person of color and formerly an enslaved American), viewed racism as one of many negative side-effects of capitalism and expected that it would vanish in a post-capitalist world. However, among modern anarchists anti-racism plays a more prominent role and racism is typically viewed as one of several forms of social hierarchy and stratification which must be destroyed. No anarchist organizations has ever included racism as part of its platform and many—particularly modern formations—include explicit anti-racism, with the national-anarchist movement being rejected as part of anarchism for his perceived racism, among other reasons. For instance, American anarchists were alone in opposing racism against Chinese and Mexican workers in the late 19th century and early 20th century. Since the late 1970s, anarchists have been involved in fighting the rise of neo-fascist groups. In Germany and the United Kingdom, some anarchists worked within militant anti-fascist groups alongside members of the Marxist left. They advocated directly combating fascists with physical force rather than relying on the state. Since the late 1990s, a similar tendency has developed within anarchism in the United States.

Anti-Racist Action is one of the largest grassroots anti-fascist and anti-racist organizations in North America today and counts many anarchists among its members. Their tactics, centered around directly confronting neo-fascist and white-supremacist groups, are considered controversial both within the anarchist movement (where they are sometimes portrayed as well-intentioned, but ineffective) and in mainstream society (where they are often portrayed as violent and disruptive).

Many anarchists also oppose the concept of race itself, arguing that it has no biological basis in science and is a social construction designed to divide the working class and preserve capitalism.

A minority of historically prominent anarchists have been accused of racism, e.g. Pierre-Joseph Proudhon and Mikhail Bakunin.

Religion 

From Pierre-Joseph Proudhon and Mikhail Bakunin to the Spanish anarcho-syndicalists, most anarchists have questioned or opposed organized religion, believing that most organized religions are hierarchical or authoritarian and more often than not aligned with contemporary power structures like the state and capital. Nonetheless, others reconcile anarchism with religion.

Christian anarchists believe that there is no higher authority than God and oppose earthly authority such as government and established churches. They believe that Jesus' teachings and the practice of the early Church were clearly anarchistic. Some of them feel that the teachings of the Nazarenes and other early groups of followers were corrupted by contemporary religious views, most notably when Theodosius I declared Nicene Christianity the official religion of the Roman Empire. Christian anarchists who follow Jesus' directive to turn the other cheek are usually strict pacifists, although some believe in a limited justification of defense, especially defense of others. The most famous advocate of Christian anarchism was Leo Tolstoy, author of The Kingdom of God Is Within You, who called for a society based on compassion, nonviolent principles and freedom. Christian anarchists tend to form experimental communities (such as the Catholic Worker). They also occasionally resist taxation.

Buddhist anarchism originated in the influential Chinese anarchist movement of the 1920s. Taixu, one of the leading thinkers and writers of this school, was deeply influenced by the work of Christian anarchists like Tolstoy and by the ancient Chinese well-field system. In the late 19th century, the Ghadar movement in India (see Har Dayal), influenced by Buddhist thought and by Swami Dayananda Saraswati (founder of Arya Samaj), saw anarchism as a way of propagating the ancient culture of the Arya (not to be confused with the much later appropriation of Aryan identity by Nazism). Buddhist anarchism was later revived in the 1960s by writers such as Gary Snyder; an incarnation of this school of thought was popularized by Jack Kerouac in his book The Dharma Bums.

With its focus on the environment and equality along with its often decentralized nature, Neopaganism has led to a number of Neopagan anarchists. One of the most prominent is Starhawk, who writes extensively about both spirituality and activism.

Discussing the anarchist movement in Britain in 2002, Adam K. has argued that it "has an especially ignorant and hegemonistic perception of the Muslim community" which he attributed to "the [A]nglo-centric nature of the movement". Quoting the statement that "Islam is an enemy of all freedom loving people" from an anarchist magazine, he argues that this is "no different to the bigoted rhetoric of George Bush or even BNP leader Nick Griffin".

Capitalism 

Throughout all of its history, anarchism has been defined by its proponents in opposition to capitalism which they believe can be maintained only by state violence. Anarchists generally follow Pierre-Joseph Proudhon in opposing ownership of workplaces by capitalists and aim to replace wage labor with workers' associations. These anarchists also agree with Peter Kropotkin's comment that "the origin of the anarchist inception of society [lies in] the criticism [...] of the hierarchical organisations and the authoritarian conceptions of society" rather than in simple opposition to the state or government. They argue that the wage system is hierarchical and authoritarian in nature and consequently capitalism cannot be anarchist. Conversely, anarcho-capitalists generally support wage labor and oppose workplace democracy which most anarchists support, claiming that wage labor is voluntary. However, most anarchists argue that certain capitalist transactions, including wage labor, are not voluntary and that maintaining the class structure of a capitalist society requires coercion which violates both anarchist principles and anarcho-capitalism's non-aggression principle itself. Anarchists who support wage labor do so as long as the employers and employees are paid equally for equal hours worked and neither party has authority over the other. By following this principle, no individual profits from the labor of another. Those anarchists describe the wages received in such an employer-employee relationship as the individual laborer's full product and generally envisione that in such a society every worker would be self-employed and own their own private means of production, free to walk away from employment contracts.

Some supporters argue that anarcho-capitalism is a form of individualist anarchism. However, most early individualist anarchists considered themselves "fervent anti-capitalists [who see] no contradiction between their individualist stance and their rejection of capitalism". Many defined themselves as socialists. These early individualist anarchists defined capitalism in various ways, but it was often discussed in terms of usury: "There are three forms of usury, interest on money, rent on land and houses, and profit in exchange. Whoever is in receipt of any of these is a usurer". Excluding these, they tended to support free trade, free competition and varying levels of private property such as mutualism based on occupation and use property norms. It is this distinction which has led to the rift between anarchism and anarcho-capitalism. Historically, anarchists considered themselves socialists and opposed to capitalism, therefore anarcho-capitalism is considered by many anarchists today as not being a form of anarchism.

Furthermore, terms like anarcho-socialism or socialist anarchism are rejected by most anarchists since they generally consider themselves socialists of the libertarian tradition, but they are nevertheless used by anarcho-capitalism theorists and scholars who recognize anarcho-capitalism to differentiate between the two. Ultimately, anarcho-capitalist author Murray Rothbard, who coined the term itself and developed such philosophy through the 1970s, stated that individualist anarchism is different from capitalism due to the individualist anarchists retaining the labor theory of value and many writers deny that anarcho-capitalism is a form of anarchism at all, or that capitalism itself is compatible with anarchism. seeing it instead as a form of New Right libertarianism.

Anarchist organisations such as the Confederación Nacional del Trabajo (Spain) and the Anarchist Federation (Britain and Ireland) generally take an explicitly anti-capitalist stance. In the 20th century, several economists began to formulate a form of radical American libertarianism known as anarcho-capitalism. This has met resistance from those who hold that capitalism is inherently oppressive or statist and many anarchists and scholars do not consider anarcho-capitalism to properly cohere with the spirit, principles, or history of anarchism. While other anarchists and scholars regard anarchism as referring only to opposition to the non-privatisation of all aspects of the state and do consider anarcho-capitalism to be a form of anarchism, Gary Chartier has joined Kevin Carson, Roderick T. Long, Charles W. Johnson, Sheldon Richman and Chris Matthew Sciabarra in maintaining that because of its heritage and its emancipatory goals and potential radical market anarchism should be seen by its proponents and by others as part of the socialist tradition and that market anarchists can and should call themselves socialists, echoing the language of libertarian socialists like American individualist anarchists Benjamin Tucker and Lysander Spooner and British Thomas Hodgskin.

In particular, Chartier has argued that proponents of a genuinely free market, termed freed market to distinguish them from the common conception which these left-libertarians (referred to as left-wing market anarchists or market-oriented left-libertarians) believe to be riddled with statist and capitalist privileges, should explicitly reject capitalism and identify with the global anti-capitalist movement while emphasizing that the abuses the anti-capitalist movement highlights result from state-tolerated violence and state-secured privilege rather than from voluntary cooperation and exchange. Indeed, proponents of this approach strongly affirm the classical liberal ideas of self-ownership and free markets while maintaining that taken to their logical conclusions these ideas support anti-capitalist, anti-corporatist, anti-hierarchical and pro-labor positions in economics; anti-imperialism in foreign policy; and thoroughly radical views regarding such cultural issues as gender, sexuality and race.

One major issue and divide between anarchism and anarcho-capitalism are the terms capitalism and socialism themselves. For anarcho-capitalists, capitalism means the free market rather than actually existing capitalism (of which they are critics, arguing that the problem rests on corporatism and state capitalism, a term coined by German socialist Wilhelm Liebknecht, but whose concept can be traced back to anarchists like Mikhail Bakunin and Jan Wacław Machajski, rather than capitalism itself) as advocated by anti-capitalists and socialism is conflated with state socialism and Marxist–Leninist states. However, the term socialism originally included any opponent of capitalism, a term coined in the 18th century to mean a construed political system built on privileges for the owners of capital.

Contra anarcho-capitalists, anarchists argue that capitalism necessarily rests on the state to survive and state capitalism is seen as the inevitable result of both capitalism and state socialism. Furthermore, the free market itself for classical economists such as Adam Smith did not necessarily refer to a market free from government interference as it is now commonly assumed or how anarcho-capitalists see it, but rather free from all forms of economic privilege, monopolies and artificial scarcities, implying that economic rents, i.e. profits generated from a lack of perfect competition, must be reduced or eliminated as much as possible through free competition. While anarcho-capitalists who argue for private property which supports absentee and landlordism ownership rather than occupation and use property norms as well as the homestead principle are considered right-libertarians rather than anarchists (this is due to anarchism generally viewing any absentee ownership and ownership claims on land and natural resources as immoral and illegitimate and seeing the idea of perpetually binding original appropriation as advocated by some anarcho-capitalists as anathema to traditional schools of anarchism as well as to any moral or economic philosophy that takes equal natural rights to land and the Earth's resources as a premise), other anarcho-capitalists are closer to mutualism and are considered part of free-market anarchism which argue that a true free-market or laissez-faire system would be best served under socialism rather than capitalism.

As a whole, anarchism is seen part of the socialist tradition, with the main divide being between anti-market anarchists (most social anarchists, including anarcho-communists, anarcho-syndicalists and collectivist anarchists) who support some form of decentralised economic planning and pro-market anarchists (certain individualist anarchists, including free-market anarchists and mutualists) who support free-market socialism. As such, Chartier has argued that anarcho-capitalists should reject capitalism and call themselves free-market advocates, writing that "it makes sense for [freed-market advocates] to name what they oppose "capitalism." Doing so calls attention to the freedom movement's radical roots, emphasizes the value of understanding society as an alternative to the state, underscores the fact that proponents of freedom object to non-aggressive as well as aggressive restraints on liberty, ensures that advocates of freedom aren't confused with people who use market rhetoric to prop up an unjust status quo, and expresses solidarity between defenders of freed markets and workers — as well as ordinary people around the world who use "capitalism" as a short-hand label for the world-system that constrains their freedom and stunts their lives".

Another major issue and divide within anarchism and anarcho-capitalism is that of property, more specifically the issues of private property. By property, or private property, ever since Proudhon's book What is Property?, published in 1840, anarchists meant possession (or what other socialists, including Marxists and communists, distingue as personal property) which he considered as liberty ("Property is liberty") versus productive property (such as land and infrastructure, or what Marxists terms the means of production and the means of labor) which he considered as theft ("Property is theft"), causing him to also say "Property is impossible".

Individualist anarchists like Tucker started calling possession as property, or private property. Anarcho-capitalists generally make no such distinction. Such distinction is extremely important to anarchists and other socialists because in the capitalist mode of production private and personal property are considered to be exactly equivalent. They make the following distinctions:

 Personal property, or possession, includes items intended for personal use (e.g. one's toothbrush, clothes, homes, vehicles and sometimes money). It must be gained in a socially fair manner and the owner has a distributive right to exclude others.
 Anarchists generally agree that private property is a social relationship between the owner and persons deprived (not a relationship between person and thing), e.g. artifacts, factories, mines, dams, infrastructure, natural vegetation, mountains, deserts and seas. In this context, private property and ownership means ownership of the means of production, not personal possessions.
 To anarchists and socialists alike, the term private property refers to capital or the means of production while personal property refers to consumer and non-capital goods and services.

Globalization 
Many anarchists are actively involved in the anti-globalization movement, seeing corporate globalization as a neocolonialist attempt to use economic coercion on a global scale, carried out through state institutions such as the World Bank, World Trade Organization, Group of Eight and the World Economic Forum. Globalization is an ambiguous term that has different meanings to different anarchist factions. Many anarchists use the term to mean neocolonialism and/or cultural imperialism (which they may see as related). Others, particularly anarcho-capitalists, use globalization to mean the worldwide expansion of the division of labor and trade which they see as beneficial so long as governments do not intervene. Anarcho-capitalists and market anarchists also see the worldwide expansion of the division of labor through trade (globalization) as a boon, but they oppose the regulation and cartelization imposed by the World Bank, World Trade Organization and "managed trade" agreements such as the North American Free Trade Agreement (NAFTA) and the Central America Free Trade Agreement (CAFTA). Many also object to fiat money issued by central banks and resulting debasement of money and confiscation of wealth. Groups such as Reclaim the Streets were among the instigators of the so-called anti-globalization movement.

The Carnival Against Capitalism on 18 June 1999 is generally regarded as the first of the major anti-globalization protests. Anarchists such as the WOMBLES have on occasion played a significant role in planning, organising and participating in subsequent protests. The protests tended to be organised on anarchist direct action principles with a general tolerance for a range of different activities ranging from those who engage in tactical frivolity to the black blocs.

Left and right anarchism 
The term left anarchism, or left-wing anarchism, has been occasionally used to distinguish social anarchism from anarcho-capitalism and anti-state right-libertarian philosophies. "Left anarchists" refer to political philosophies which posit a future society in which private property is replaced by reciprocity and non-hierarchical society. The term left anarchism is sometimes used synonymously with libertarian socialism, left-libertarianism, or social anarchism. Anarchists typically discourage the concept of left-wing theories of anarchism on grounds of redundancy and that it lends legitimacy to the notion that anarchism is compatible with capitalism or nationalism.

Syndicalist Ulrike Heider categorized anarchism into left anarchism, right anarchism and green anarchism. The term right anarchism, or right-wing anarchism, has been used to refer to schools of thoughts which are not generally considered part of anarchism, including anarcho-capitalism and national-anarchism.

Nationalism 

Anarchism has a long history of opposing imperialism, both in the core nations (the colonizers) and the periphery nations (the colonized). In general, anarchists have preferred to focus on building revolutions at home and doing solidarity work for comrades in other countries, e.g. Guy Aldred was jailed for printing Shyamji Krishnavarma's The Indian Sociologist. Another example of this was Rudolf Rocker, a prominent German anarchist and anti-fascist who was particularly active amongst Jewish workers. In his Nationalism and Culture, he argued for a "federation of European peoples" which would include Jews. Rejecting biological theories of race and the concept of nation, he argued that since it was European states that had conquered and colonized the rest of the world, successful libertarian organization amongst Europeans was "the first condition for the creation of a world federation which will also secure the so-called colonial peoples the same rights for the pursuit of happiness. Many modern anarchists and other anti-imperialists share this approach.

Historically, anarchism was supportive of the anationalist movement as well as of the Esperanto language, a language constructed to serve as a politically and ethnically neutral international language. After the Spanish Civil War, Francoist Spain persecuted anarchists and Catalan nationalists, among whom the use of Esperanto was extensive. The so-called national-anarchist movement is not recognized as part of anarchism by anarchists and scholars due to anarchism opposition to nationalism, the nation state, tribalism and neo-tribalism and national-anarchism's perceived racism and sexism, arguing that it represents a further evolution in the thinking of the radical right rather than an entirely new dimension. Some accuse national-anarchists of being white nationalists who promote ethnic and racial separatism while others argue they want the militant chic of calling themselves anarchists without the historical and philosophical baggage that accompanies such a claim.

During the 2014 Scottish independence referendum, there was debate within anarchist circles about whether to take an abstentionist position, vote for independence, or to vote to remain in the United Kingdom, therefore anarchists rarely fitted into the easy binary of Yes/No voters of the referendum, with all seeking to go beyond the choices offered at the ballot box. There was also a debate about what Scottish independence would mean for the anarchist movement and social struggle. Groups like the Anarchist Federation in Scotland (mainly in Edinburgh and Glasgow) took a critical stance skeptical of the benefits of Scottish independence. Scottish anarchists argued that Scottish independence and Scottish nationalism diverted energy away from grassroots struggles and that the movement for Scottish independence sucked people towards Scottish nationalism and electoral politics.

Environment 

The environment and sustainability have been an issue for anarchists from at least as far back as Peter Kropotkin's 1899 book Fields, Factories and Workshops, but since the late 1970s anarchists in English-speaking world and European countries have been agitating for the natural environment. Eco-anarchists or green anarchists often embrace deep ecology, a worldview that strives to cultivate biodiversity and sustainability. Eco-anarchists often use direct action against what they see as Earth-destroying institutions. Of particular importance is the Earth First! movement that takes action such as tree sitting. The more militant Earth Liberation Front which grew out of Earth First! also has connections with the anarchist movement. Another important component is ecofeminism which sees the domination of nature as a metaphor for the domination of women.

Murray Bookchin's work on social ecology, David Watson's work with Fifth Estate magazine, Steve Booth's work in the United Kingdom publication Green Anarchist and Graham Purchase's writings on green syndicalism have all contributed to the broad variety and scope of green anarchist/eco-anarchist thought and action. Green anarchism also involves a critique of industrial capitalism and for some green anarchists (including anarcho-primitivists) civilization itself.

Relations with the left 

While many anarchists (especially those involved in the anti-globalization movement) continue to see themselves as a leftist movement, some thinkers and activists believe it is necessary to re-evaluate anarchism's relationship with the traditional left. Like many radical ideologies, most anarchist schools of thought are to some degree sectarian. There is often a difference of opinion within each school about how to react to, or interact with, other schools. Many anarchists draw from a wide range of political perspectives, such as the Zapatista Army of National Liberation, the Situationists, ultra-leftists, autonomist Marxism and various indigenous cultures.

A movement called post-left anarchy seeks to distance itself from the traditional left—communists, socialists, social democrats and the like—and to escape the confines of ideology in general. Post-leftists argue that anarchism has been weakened by its long attachment to contrary leftist movements and single issue causes (anti-war, anti-nuclear and so on). It calls for a synthesis of anarchist thought and a specifically anti-authoritarian revolutionary movement outside of the leftist milieu. Important groups and individuals associated with post-left anarchy include CrimethInc., the magazine Anarchy: A Journal of Desire Armed and its editor Jason McQuinn, Bob Black, Hakim Bey and others.

The term post-anarchism was originated by Saul Newman, first receiving popular attention in his book From Bakunin to Lacan, a synthesis of classical anarchist theory and poststructuralist thought. Subsequent to Newman's use of the term, it has taken on a life of its own and a wide range of ideas including autonomism, post-left anarchy, Situationism, postcolonialism and Zapatismo. By its very nature, post-anarchism rejects the idea that it should be a coherent set of doctrines and beliefs. Key thinkers nonetheless associated with post-anarchism include Saul Newman, Todd May, Gilles Deleuze and Félix Guattari.

Some activists calling themselves insurrectionary anarchists are critical of formal anarchist labor unions and federations and advocate informal organization, carrying out acts of resistance in various struggles. Proponents include Wolfi Landstreicher and Alfredo M. Bonanno, author of works including Armed Joy and The Anarchist Tension. This tendency is represented in the United States in magazines such as Willful Disobedience and Killing King Abacus.

Communism 
While communism is proposed as a form of social and economic organisation by many anarchists, other anarchists consider it a danger to the liberty and free development of the individual. Most schools of anarchism have recognized a distinction between libertarian and authoritarian forms of communism. Pierre-Joseph Proudhon said of communism that "whether of the utopian or the Marxist variety, that it destroyed freedom by taking away from the individual control over his means of production", adding: "Communism is exploitation of the strong by the weak". Mikhail Bakunin stated: "I hate Communism because it is the negation of liberty and because for me humanity is unthinkable without liberty. I am not a Communist, because Communism concentrates and swallows up in itself for the benefit of the State all the forces of society, because it inevitably leads to the concentration of property in the hands of the State". However, Bakunin was speaking of authoritarian and statist forms of communism and socialism (see also state capitalism and its origins and early uses of the term) as verified by the last line which mentions state property—anarcho-communists explicitly reject state property and authority, especially centralized authority—and famously proclaimed: "We are convinced that freedom without Socialism is privilege and injustice, and that Socialism without freedom is slavery and brutality". Even American individualist anarchist Benjamin Tucker, who insisted on the voluntary nature of all association and opposed communism along with majority rule, organized religion and the institution of marriage due to their compulsory nature, argued: "Whoever denies private property is of necessity an Archist. This excludes from Anarchism all believers in compulsory Communism. As for the believers in voluntary Communism (of whom there are precious few), they are of necessity believers in the liberty to hold private property, for to pool one's possessions with those of others is nothing more or less than an exercise of proprietorship".

Karl Marx's communist society is actually based on free association which he called a community of freely associated individuals. Marx's communist society is one in which "the full and free development of every individual forms the ruling principle" and "the free development of each is the condition for the free development of all". Hence, Marx justified the forms of equality he did advocate such as the communal ownership and control of the economy on the grounds that they led to human freedom and human development, arguing that "the realm of freedom actually begins only where labor which is determined by necessity and mundane considerations ceases; thus in the very nature of things it lies beyond the sphere of actual material production. According to Allen Woods, a communist society is one that has transcended class antagonisms and "would not be one in which some truly universal interest at last reigns, to which individual interests must be sacrificed. It would instead be a society in which individuals freely act as the truly human individuals they are", making Marx's communist society radically individualistic.

Although Peter Kropotkin, one of the leading proponents of anarcho-communism while also opposing statist communism, argued for an economic model of free distribution between all individuals, many individualist anarchists oppose communism in all its forms on the grounds that voluntary communism is not practicable. Individualist anarchists such as Benjamin Tucker, Victor Yarros and Henry Appleton have denied that communism is a genuine form of anarchism. They rejected its strategies and argued that it is inherently authoritarian. In the opinion of Appleton, "Communism, being opposed to natural law, must necessarily call upon unnatural methods if it would put itself into practice" and employ "pillage, brute force, and violence". As a response, Albert Meltzer argued that since individualist anarchists like Tucker promote the idea of private armies, they actually support a "limited State", contending that it "is only possible to conceive of Anarchism which is free, communistic and offering no economic necessity for repression of countering it". Anarcho-communists also reject the criticism, pointing to the principle of voluntary association that underpins their theory and differentiates it from statist communism. Some individualist anarchists are willing to recognize such communism as a legitimate form. Kevin Carson writes that "free market, libertarian communist, syndicalism, and other kinds of collectivist anarchists must learn to coexist in peace and mutual respect today, in our fight against the corporate state, and tomorrow, in the panarchy that is likely to succeed it".

As a response, there emerged in the 1980s United States the tendency of post-left anarchy which was influenced profoundly by egoism in aspects such as the critique of ideology. Jason McQuinn says that "when I (and other anti-ideological anarchists) criticize ideology, it is always from a specifically critical, anarchist perspective rooted in both the skeptical, individualist-anarchist philosophy of Max Stirner". Bob Black and Feral Faun/Wolfi Landstreicher also strongly adhere to Stirnerist egoism. A reprinting of The Right to be Greedy in the 1980s was done with the involvement of Black who also wrote the preface to it. In the book's preface, Black has humorously suggested the idea of "Marxist Stirnerism" just as he wrote an essay on "groucho-marxism", writing: "If Marxism-Stirnerism is conceivable, every orthodoxy prating of freedom or liberation is called into question, anarchism included. The only reason to read this book, as its authors would be the first to agree, is for what you can get out of it".

Hakim Bey has said: "From Stirner's "Union of Self-Owning Ones" we proceed to Nietzsche's circle of "Free Spirits" and thence to Charles Fourier's "Passional Series", doubling and redoubling ourselves even as the Other multiplies itself in the eros of the group". Bey also wrote: "The Mackay Society, of which Mark & I are active members, is devoted to the anarchism of Max Stirner, Benj. Tucker & John Henry Mackay. [...] The Mackay Society, incidentally, represents a little-known current of individualist thought which never cut its ties with revolutionary labor. Dyer Lum, Ezra & Angela Haywood represent this school of thought; Jo Labadie, who wrote for Tucker's Liberty, made himself a link between the American "plumb-line" anarchists, the "philosophical" individualists, & the syndicalist or communist branch of the movement; his influence reached the Mackay Society through his son, Laurance. Like the Italian Stirnerites (who influenced us through our late friend Enrico Arrigoni) we support all anti-authoritarian currents, despite their apparent contradictions".

Marxism 
Anarchism has had a strained relationship with Marxism since Karl Marx's life. The dispute between Marx and Mikhail Bakunin highlighted the differences between anarchism and Marxism, with Bakunin criticizing Marx for his authoritarian bent. Bakunin also argued—against certain ideas of a number of Marxists—that not all revolutions need to be violent. For instance, he strongly rejected Marx's concept of the dictatorship of the proletariat, a concept that vanguardist socialism, including Marxist–Leninism, would use to justify one-party rule from above by a party representing the proletariat. Bakunin insisted that revolutions must be led by the people directly while any "enlightened elite" must only exert influence by remaining "invisible [...] not imposed on anyone [...] [and] deprived of all official rights and significance". He held that the state should be immediately abolished because all forms of government eventually lead to oppression.

Bakunin has sometimes been called the first theorist of the concept of a new class, meaning that a class of intellectuals and bureaucrats running the state in the name of the people or the proletariat—but in reality in their own interests alone. Bakunin argued that the "State has always been the patrimony of some privileged class: a priestly class, an aristocratic class, a bourgeois class. And finally, when all the other classes have exhausted themselves, the State then becomes the patrimony of the bureaucratic class and then falls—or, if you will, rises—to the position of a machine". Bakunin also had a different view as compared to Marx's on the revolutionary potential of the lumpenproletariat and the proletariat. As such, "[b]oth agreed that the proletariat would play a key role, but for Marx the proletariat was the exclusive, leading revolutionary agent while Bakunin entertained the possibility that the peasants and even the lumpenproletariat (the unemployed, common criminals, etc.) could rise to the occasion". Bakunin "considers workers' integration in capital as destructive of more primary revolutionary forces. For Bakunin, the revolutionary archetype is found in a peasant milieu (which is presented as having longstanding insurrectionary traditions, as well as a communist archetype in its current social form—the peasant commune) and amongst educated unemployed youth, assorted marginals from all classes, brigands, robbers, the impoverished masses, and those on the margins of society who have escaped, been excluded from, or not yet subsumed in the discipline of emerging industrial work. [...] [I]n short, all those whom Marx sought to include in the category of the lumpenproletariat".

While both anarchists and Marxists share the same final goal, the creation of a free, egalitarian society without social classes and government, they strongly disagree on how to achieve this goal. Anarchists, especially social anarchists, believe that the classless, stateless society should be established by the direct action of the masses, culminating in social revolution and refusing any intermediate stage such as the dictatorship of the proletariat on the basis that such a dictatorship will become a self-perpetuating fundament. However, libertarian Marxists argue that Marx used the phrase to mean that the worker control at the point of production and not a party would still be a state until society is reorganized according to socialist principles. For Bakunin, the fundamental contradiction is that for the Marxists "anarchism or freedom is the aim, while the state and dictatorship is the means, and so, in order to free the masses, they have first to be enslaved". Ultimately, the main divide between anarchism and Marxism is between decentralisation and centralisation, with anarchists favouring decentralisation and Marxists arguing that due to the Industrial Revolution and later stages of the Industrial Revolution a certain degree of authority and centralisation has become necessary or inevitable.

Anarchists and many non-Marxist libertarian socialists reject the need for a transitory state phase, claiming that socialism can only be established through decentralized, non-coercive organization. The phrases barracks socialism or barracks communism became a shorthand for this critique, evoking the image of citizens' lives being as regimented as the lives of conscripts in a barracks. Ironically, the term barracks communism was coined by Marx himself to refer to a crude, authoritarian, forced collectivism and communism where all aspects of life are bureaucratically regimented and communal. Originally, Marx used the expression to criticise the vision of Sergey Nechayev outlined in "The Fundamentals of the Future Social System" which had a major influence on other Russian revolutionaries like Pyotr Tkachev and Vladimir Lenin. The term barracks here does not refer to military barracks, but to the workers' barracks-type primitive dormitories in which industrial workers lived in many places in the Russian Empire of the time. Later, political theorists of the Soviet Union applied this term to China under Mao Zedong. Still later during the Soviet perestroika period, the term was used to apply to the history of the Soviet Union itself.

Noam Chomsky is critical of Marxism's dogmatic strains and the idea of Marxism itself, but he still appreciates Marx's contributions to political thought. Unlike some anarchists, Chomsky does not consider Bolshevism "Marxism in practice", but he does recognize that Marx was a complicated figure who had conflicting ideas. While acknowledging the latent authoritarianism in Marx, Chomsky also points to the libertarian strains that developed into the council communism of Rosa Luxemburg and Anton Pannekoek. However, his commitment to libertarian socialism has led him to characterize himself as an anarchist with radical Marxist leanings. As a response to those critiques, libertarian Marxism refers to a broad scope of economic and political philosophies that emphasize the anti-authoritarian aspects of Marxism. Early currents of libertarian Marxism, known as left communism, emerged in opposition to Marxism–Leninism and its derivatives such as Stalinism and Maoism, among others. Libertarian Marxism is also often critical of reformist positions, such as those held by social democrats. Libertarian Marxist currents often draw from Marx and Friedrich Engels' later works, specifically the Grundrisse and The Civil War in France, emphasizing the Marxist belief in the ability of the working class to forge its own destiny without the need for a revolutionary party or state to mediate or aid its liberation. Along with anarchism, libertarian Marxism is one of the main currents of libertarian socialism.

See also 
 Anarchism and issues related to love and sex

Explanatory notes

References

Further reading 
 
 Gordon, Uri (2007). "Anarchism and Political Theory: Contemporary Problems". The Anarchist Library. Retrieved 4 May 2019.
 Kerl, Eric (July–August 2010). "Contemporary anarchism". International Socialist Review (72). Retrieved 4 May 2019.

External links